Kinali may refer to:

 Didem (belly dancer) (Didem Kinali, born 1986), Turkish belly dancer
 Selahattin Kınalı (born 1978), Turkish footballer
 Eren Kinali, English footballer
 Kınalı Kar, Turkish drama television series

Turkish-language surnames